The Dreischusterspitze is a mountain of the Dolomites in South Tyrol, Italy. It is the highest peak of the Sexten Dolomites and the most northerly 3,000m peak of the range. From the north it resembles a majestic pyramid, while from the east and west it resembles a jagged ridge. The mountain is located above the village of Sexten. It was first climbed in 1869 by Paul Grohmann, Franz Innerkofler and Peter Salcher.

Huts in the area are the Dreischusterhütte (Rifugio Tre Scarperi, 1653 m) in the Innerfeldtal as well as the Talschlusshütte (Rifugio al Fondo Valle, 1548 m) in the Fischlein Valley and the Dreizinnenhütte (Rifugio Locatelli, 2405 m) in the south of the Schusterplatte.

References 

Alpenverein South Tyrol 

Mountains of the Alps
Mountains of South Tyrol
Alpine three-thousanders
Dolomites